Saidur Rahman Dawn (born 18 January 1963) is a Bangladeshi sprinter. He competed in the men's 100 metres at the 1984 Summer Olympics.

References

External links
 

1963 births
Living people
Athletes (track and field) at the 1984 Summer Olympics
Bangladeshi male sprinters
Olympic athletes of Bangladesh
Place of birth missing (living people)